The 1947 NCAA Tennis Championships were the second annual tournaments to determine the national champions of NCAA men's collegiate tennis. Matches were played during May 1947 in Los Angeles, California. A total of three championships were contested: men's team, singles, and doubles. The men's team championship was determined by total points earned in other events.

The men's team championship was won by William & Mary, their first team national title. The Indians (10 points) finished six points ahead of Rice (4). The men's singles title was won by Gardner Larned, from William & Mary, and the men's doubles title went to Sam Match and Bob Curtis, from Rice.

References

External links
List of NCAA Men's Tennis Champions
List of NCAA Women's Tennis Champions

NCAA Division I tennis championships
1947 in American tennis